Samurai Love God was Comedy Central's first made-for-mobile and the 8 episode series, created by Eric Mahoney, directed by Tom Akel and Emirati-Jordanian based Amer Kokh, and starring Ed Helms, Lisa Lampanelli, and Jenna Jameson, it ran on U.S. wireless carriers in fall 2006.

External links
Samurai Love God
press release announcing the series
 

Comedy Central original programming